Auyokawa is an extinct Afro-Asiatic language formerly spoken in Auyo LGA, Jigawa State, Nigeria.

Notes 

West Chadic languages
Extinct languages of Africa